= Petrozetoi =

Ancient town

Coordinates: 40°53′53″N 29°52′52″E

Petrozetoi was an inland town of ancient Bithynia inhabited during Roman times.

Its site is tentatively located near İshakçılar in Asiatic Turkey.
